The Brooks Camp Boat House is a historic boathouse at Brooks Camp, a major visitor site in Katmai National Park and Preserve, located on the Alaska Peninsula of southwestern Alaska.  The boat house is a simple rectangular log structure with large double-leaf door on the water side, and a door and window on the land side.  It was built in 1959 by the National Park Service, and is the second building built in the park by the Park Service.  It is used as a ranger station.

The building was listed on the National Register of Historic Places in 2010.

See also
National Register of Historic Places listings in Lake and Peninsula Borough, Alaska
National Register of Historic Places listings in Katmai National Park and Preserve

References

1959 establishments in Alaska
Buildings and structures completed in 1959
Log cabins in the United States
Park buildings and structures on the National Register of Historic Places in Alaska
Ranger stations in the United States
Buildings and structures on the National Register of Historic Places in Lake and Peninsula Borough, Alaska
Log buildings and structures on the National Register of Historic Places in Alaska
National Register of Historic Places in Katmai National Park and Preserve
National Register of Historic Places in Lake and Peninsula Borough, Alaska